Maja squinado (the European spider crab, spiny spider crab or spinous spider crab) is a species of migratory crab found in the north-east Atlantic and the Mediterranean Sea. The appearance of the European spider crab is similar to the much larger Japanese spider crab.

Young 
The young of M. squinado are slightly longer than 1mm after hatching, and weigh approximately 0.12 mg at this time. Within 4–8 days, the larva moults numerous times, finally ending with morphological changes that presumably include the further development and increase in size of the cephalothorax. In a second phase, the Carapace grows to a length of approx. 2mm, and weighs approx. 0.3 mg.

The larva then undergoes metamorphosis to the first juvenile instar, and changes its planktonic life to a benthic one (living on the sea floor). Its appearance is also similar to that of the adult animal. From this stage only growth and the formation of sexual maturity follows. In observations under laboratory conditions, approx. 10.5% of the hatched zoea made it to this stage. The same conditions in terms of food, temperature and the like cannot be created in a laboratory. Animals in the first juvenile stage perform their first moult about 21 days after hatching, and therefore enter the second juvenile stage. 

Here there is a considerable increase in the length of the carapace to approx. 4.51 mm. The second moult marks the beginning of the third juvenile stage, the animal now has the appearance of the adult, with a carapace length of approx. 5.63 mm, but is not sexually mature.

Juvenile animals spend another 2 years moulting and growing in size. The juvenile animals live in shallow water in winter, between rocks in coastal kelp forests. They spend the summer on small rocky reefs at a depth of only about 4 m. After this time, they reach a carapace length between 6–13 cm, with no noticeable sex-specific differences. During this time they are not yet sexually mature.

There are two main periods for the critical moults that follow the approximately two-year period of growth leading to sexual maturity: the first, the prepubertal, in April, and the second, the pubertal, from July to October. However, in captive animals it has been noticed that in very large individuals that are in the phase before one of the two moults, one moult may be lost entirely, or be very late. Likewise, three moults have been observed on some individual specimens. The average time interval between the two critical moults is 104 days. Typically, the carapace length in animals that are already comparatively large increases less after moulting, relative to the initial size, than that of smaller animals. This also explains why there is a smaller increase in length (approx. 27%) in the pubescent moult than in the prepubertal (approx. 36%).

Behavior 
All crabs are vulnerable to predation when moulting, and M. squinado becomes gregarious around that time, presumably for defense against predators. Females can produce up to four broods per year. M. squinado has been documented to feed on macroalgae and benthic invertebrates. From a 1992 study done in Galicia, seaweeds from the Laminariaceae, Corallina spp., molluscs, the gastropods Bittium spp., Trochiidae, the bivalve Mytilus spp., echinoderms, and others were observed as part of the diet of this particular species.

Fishery
M. squinado is the subject of commercial fishery, with over 5,000 tonnes caught annually, more than 70% the coast of France, over 10% off the coast of the United Kingdom, 6% from the Channel Islands, 3% from each of Spain and Ireland, 2% from Croatia, 1% from Portugal, and the remainder coming from Montenegro, Denmark, and Morocco, although official production figures are open to doubt. The European Union imposes a minimum landing size of 120 mm for M. squinado, and some individual countries have other regulations, such as a ban on landing egg-bearing females in Spain and a closed season in France and the Channel Islands.

Taxonomy

A review of the species complex around M. squinado was able to differentiate between specimens from the Mediterranean Sea and those from the Atlantic, and concluded that the Atlantic specimens were a separate species, called Maja brachydactyla Balss, 1922.

References

External links
 

Majoidea
Edible crustaceans
Commercial crustaceans
Crustaceans of the Atlantic Ocean
Fauna of the Mediterranean Sea
Crustaceans described in 1788
Taxa named by Johann Friedrich Wilhelm Herbst